Komori Dam may refer to
Komori Dam
Komori Dam (Gunma, Japan)